Permanent standard time refers to the year-round observation of standard time. Likewise, permanent daylight saving time refers to the year-round observation of daylight saving time (DST). Both permanent standard time and permanent DST eliminate the practice of semi-annual clock changes, specifically the advancement of clocks by one hour from standard time to DST in spring (commonly called "spring forward") and the retraction of clocks by one hour from DST to standard time in fall ("fall back"). 

The Uniform Time Act of 1966 formalized the specification of time zones and the dates of DST observation in the United States. Prior to this law, time zones and DST observation in America were independent and erratic across states and cities. The law requires states to change clocks semiannually between standard time and DST on federally mandated dates, and it permits states to opt out of DST observation altogether and remain on permanent standard time, but does not permit observation of permanent DST. Arizona (with the exception of the Navajo Nation), Hawaii, and all permanently inhabited territories observe permanent standard time.

Studies have shown the semi-annual clock changes result in sleep disturbances, ultimately resulting in more health problems and traffic accidents. Legislators in 25 states have attempted to switch to either permanent standard time or permanent DST. Currently more states are pursuing permanent DST.

Permanent standard time

Prior to the introduction of DST in 1967, all American states observed permanent Standard Time. Currently in the US, Arizona (with the exception of the Navajo Nation), Hawaii, and all permanently inhabited territories (American Samoa, Guam, the Northern Mariana Islands, Puerto Rico, and the Virgin Islands) observe permanent standard time. A number of states have proposed bills to restore observation of permanent standard time, but few have gained ground as of yet.

Possible benefits and disadvantages of standard time

Permanent standard time is considered by circadian health researchers and safety experts worldwide to be the best option for health, safety, schools, and economy, including the American Academy of Sleep Medicine, National Sleep Foundation, American College of Chest Physicians, National Safety Council, American College of Occupational and Environmental Medicine, Canadian Sleep Society, World Sleep Society, Society for Research on Biological Rhythms, and several state sleep societies. Permanent standard time is supported by advocates for school children, including the National PTA, National Education Association, American Federation of Teachers, National School Boards Association, and Start School Later. They cite both the health benefits of circadian alignment, and the safety advantages regarding morning commutes. 

It is supported by environmental evidence, owing to evidence that DST observation increases driving, morning heating, and evening air conditioning, which all in turn increase energy consumption and pollution.

Permanent daylight saving time
A change in federal law would be necessary to allow states to observe DST permanently all year. A number of states have pursued state bills, resolutions, and referendums to indicate intention to observe permanent DST if federal law would permit it.

In 2018, 2019, 2020, and 2021, Florida Republican senator Marco Rubio introduced to Congress the "Sunshine Protection Act", a bill to permit states to observe permanent DST. The bill had achieved referral to committee, but had not received a hearing. Also in 2021, Florida Republican Representative Vern Buchanan introduced a daylight saving time for the whole country, by changing everyone's time zone forward by an hour (Eastern Time would become permanently UTC-0400 instead of UTC-0500). That bill also allowed states to opt out under certain conditions. On March 15, 2022, Rubio's bill passed the Senate.

As a work-around to the Uniform Time Act's prohibition on permanent DST, a bloc of states in New England has proposed a statutory move from the Eastern Time Zone to the Atlantic Time Zone (Atlantic Time being one hour ahead of Eastern Time), and then abolishing biannual clock changes. If approved by the Department of Transportation, such a move would effectively put these states on permanent DST without needing to await amendment to the Uniform Time Act by Congress. Similarly, on the West Coast, Washington passed both a bill for permanent DST and an alternative bill to move the state's official observation from the Pacific Time Zone to the Mountain Time Zone.

Possible benefits and disadvantages of daylight time
A meta-analysis by Rutgers researchers found that permanent DST would eliminate 171 pedestrian fatalities (a 13% reduction) per year. DST has been supported by the Chamber of Commerce since 1915 attributing added sales and outdoor activity to sunlight in the evenings. Additionally, DST has been expanded to nearly 8 months of the year, effectively making it the new standard.

Some have warned, however, that the decreased exposure to morning sunlight will have significant detrimental effects. Sleep researchers have likened the resulting increased fatigue to "permanent [jet lag]". Experts such as Till Roenneberg argue that permanent observation of DST significantly increases rates of disease and accidents, and lowers productivity and wages. In 2018, the European Sleep Research Society, the European Biological Rhythms Society, and the Society for Research on Biological Rhythms (SRBR) released a joint statement to the EU Commission on DST in opposition to permanent DST and in support of permanent standard time. The SRBR followed with its own more comprehensive statement and set of materials supporting the same position in 2019. In August 2020, the American Academy of Sleep Medicine provided a statement on why they oppose permanent daylight saving time and favor permanent standard time.
Poor sleep among workers costs united states $411 billion annually, according to Rand Europe. This figure, which equates to about 1.23 million workdays lost due to insufficient sleep each year, ranks the United States first in terms of economic losses due to insufficient sleep.

The idea of staying on Daylight Saving Time during winter months is opposed by certain religious communities, such as Orthodox Jews, whose daily prayers and other customs are synchronized with times of sunrise and sunset.

Previous observation of year-round daylight saving time
Permanent DST in the US was briefly enacted by president Richard Nixon in January 1974, in response to the 1973 oil crisis. The new permanent DST law was retracted within the year. Year-round daylight saving time was initially supported by 79% of the public, but that support had dropped to 42% after its first winter.

2015–2022: Proposals for the introduction of year-round DST 

A movement has been organized in support of the legalization of using daylight saving time as the year-round clock option. Bills to end DST, and bills to make it permanent, have been introduced in more than 30 states.

The main argument for introducing year-round DST is that the lifestyles and work patterns of modern-day citizens are no longer compatible with the concept of shifting the clock every spring and fall. Supporters also argue that switching to ''Forward Time'' would also result in saving energy by reducing the need for artificial light. The Sunshine Protection Act of 2019 was introduced in the Senate by Senator Marco Rubio (R) of Florida to make the times used for DST standard time and abolish DST. It had bipartisan support from senators from Washington and Tennessee, but it had not received a hearing in the Senate Commerce, Science, and Transportation committee.

In 2015, the Nevada Senate passed Nevada Assembly Joint Resolution 4, which urged Congress to enact legislation allowing individual states to establish daylight saving time as the standard time in their respective states throughout the calendar year. This would mean that Nevada is on the same time as Arizona all year, but would be an hour ahead of California in the winter. The United States Congress has not yet enacted any enabling legislation in this regard.

In 2018, the Florida Senate approved the Sunshine Protection Act which would put Florida on permanent daylight saving time year round, and Governor Rick Scott signed it March 23. Congress would need to amend the existing 1966 federal law to allow the change.

In 2018, voters in California ratified a legislative plan which would allow for year-round daylight saving time to be enacted. However, it still requires the vote of two-thirds of the state's legislature and the approval of Congress.

In 2019, the Washington State Legislature passed Substitute House Bill 1196, which would establish year-round observation of daylight saving time contingent on the United States Congress amending federal law to authorize states to observe daylight saving time year-round. The bill passed, and was followed by proposed 2021 ballot initiative 1803, "Abolish Daylight Saving Time in Washington state" to petition the U.S. Congress to authorize the change.

Tennessee and Oregon also passed bills in 2019 for year-round DST, and legislative houses in Alabama and Arkansas also approved resolutions in favor.

Georgia governor Brian P. Kemp signed Senate Bill 100 providing for year-round daylight saving time when the United States Congress amends 15 U.S.C. Section 260a to authorize states to observe daylight saving time year round.

In 2022, the United States Senate passed a bill to make Daylight Saving Time permanent. If enacted, this bill would take effect starting in November 2023. The American Academy of Sleep Medicine has opposed the Sunshine Protection Act and called instead for permanent standard time, a position supported by the American College of Chest Physicians and the World Sleep Society, among others.

Table of state-level legislative actions

See also 

 Daylight saving time by country
 Daylight saving time in the United States
 List of time offsets by U.S. state and territory
 Standard Time Act
 Universal Time
 Winter time (clock lag)

References

External links
 Daylight Saving Time | State Legislation from the National Conference of State Legislatures
 Sunshine Protection Act of 2019

Time in the United States
United States
Daylight saving time in the United States